Mikołajów may refer to the following places:
Mikołajów, Lower Silesian Voivodeship (south-west Poland)
Mikołajów, Piotrków County in Łódź Voivodeship (central Poland)
Mikołajów, Tomaszów Mazowiecki County in Łódź Voivodeship (central Poland)
Mikołajów, Kazimierza County in Świętokrzyskie Voivodeship (south-central Poland)
Mikołajów, Staszów County in Świętokrzyskie Voivodeship (south-central Poland)

See also
Mykolaiv (disambiguation), the name of several towns in Ukraine, called Mikołajów in Polish